Galleh Gah or Galehgah may refer to:
Galehgah, Hormozgan (گله گاه - Galehgāh)
Galleh Gah, Andimeshk, Khuzestan Province (گله گه - Galleh Gah)
Galleh Gah, Lorestan (گله گه - Galleh Gah)